Higher Trengale and Lower Trengale are two farming hamlets in the parish of St Cleer, Cornwall, England. It is located to the northwest of Liskeard. They are located between Dobwalls (to the south) and Draynes (to the north). The principal river in the area is the River Fowey, which flows to the north on the other side of Trengale Wood. 
Trengale is mentioned in the Doomsday Book. It documents a Richard holding Trengale, also referred to a Turgoil, from Saint Petroc in 1086. St Neot Lower Trengale Farm Holiday Cottages are rented out year round.

See also

 List of farms in Cornwall

References

Hamlets in Cornwall
Farms in Cornwall